Rettai Roja ( Twin Rose) is a 2019-2023 Indian Tamil-language soap opera aired on Zee Tamil and also digitally available on ZEE5. It premiered on 12 August 2019 and ended on 17 March 2023 with 1013 Episodes. The show initially starred Shivani Narayanan, but she was later replaced by Chandini Tamilarasan.

Summary
Anu and Abi are twin girls from a middle-class family. Unlike their looks, their personalities differ. Anu was a dominant and greedy girl but Abi is homely and caring girl. Anu despises her sister for grabbing the spotlight despite her desperate efforts to be noticed and praised. Because of the conflict, their mother Deivanai enrols them into a convent school, but at last Anu only studied in convent, Abi became less educated. Finally Anuradha became a lawyer and Abi becomes a tailor. Meanwhile, the brothers Santhosh and Sanjeev belong to a rich and wealthy family. Santhosh was a simple man, who manages the business but Sanjeev was short-tempered and easily angered, so his mother Seetha will take care him always. Santhosh saw Anu at a theme park and begins to love her. Then Santhosh decides to join as an assistant advocate to Anu and he hides the truth about his rich background to her. Abi met Sanjeev in a car accident when he hit an old man. Sanjeev argues angrily with the old man, Abi advises Sanjeev. Suddenly he feels that Abi was like his mother's attitude. Then Sanjeev told Seetha about Abi and she felt happy. Whenever Sanjeev is about to lose his temper, Abi appears and defuses the situation. Their love blossoms. Then Seetha noticed that her first son Santhosh is in love and her second son Sanjeev turns into a new behaviour, because of Abi. One day Anu saw Abi with Sanjeev, so Anu warns her parents that Abi was roaming with a man and Anu warns Abi should stop going out with him.

Seetha told his son Santhosh to invite Anu, As Anu visits Santhosh's house she became surprised and she agrees to marry Santhosh after seeing that he is rich. While she move out, she found that Sanjeev was the younger brother of Santhosh. Anu shocked about it and thought if Abi marries Sanjeev, then she will lead a rich life. So she decides to fix a fiancée for Abi. Anu met a poor and thief name Salman and she request to marry Abi. Salman and his mother Nagalakshmi were exited and accepted to marry Abi. Sanjeev, on hearing Abi will marry Salman, he beats Salman and he found that Salman is a fraud and stops Abi from marrying him. Then the police come and arrests Salman. Now Seetha's husband Ramachandran's sister Chinthamani called her daughter Sreeja to come and to fix her as Sanjeev's fiancée. When Anu came to Santhos's house, she met Sreeja and Chinthamani and they discussed about Abi was in love with Sanjeev. So they planned to separate them. But Abi and Sanjeev resist the scheme. Anu strictly warns her parents to hide that she has a twin sister from Santhosh's parents, so they do. After some days, Anu betrothed with Santhosh and Sreeja betrothed with Sanjeev. But Sanjeev hates Sreeja and he discovers her plan, he and his uncle Kaali decides to focus on Sreeja and Anu's plans. Sanjeev told everything to Abi, so she helped him and their love became stronger. One day Santhosh saw Sanjeev with one girl, then he found that, the girl was Anu's twin sister Abi. So Santhosh decides to help them to marry. On the day of marriage, Anu, Sreeja and Chinthamani decides to kidnap Abi, so Sanjeev will marry Sreeja. So they called Salman and Nagalakshmi to kidnap, but Sanjeev and Kaali knows the plan and they prevent the crime. Again Anu pretended to be injured to Abi. Anu told Abi to leave Sanjeev. Abi exits Sanjeev's life and leaves the marriage hall. Then after some hours Anu feels guilty about her attitude towards Abi, that time Sreeja and Chinthamani conversed about Abi to be killed and they will blame Anu for Abi's death. When Anu heard, she warns them and allows Abi and Sanjeev marriage and she will reveal the truth to everybody. Sreeja and Chinthamai became dismayed and angered on Anu. Sreeja and Chinthamani murder Anu. Same time Sanjeev found Abi and he told to everybody that she is Anu's twin. Ramachandran and others became aghast about it and scold Kandhasamy and Deivanai for that. As Anu's name should not be spoil, Abi lies to Sanjeev that she loves him for fake. Sanjeev got more anger on Abi and he hates her. Seetha search Anu, then she saw Anu was lying down with blood flowing. Seetha tries to help Anu but she told every incident to Seetha and unfortunately Anu died. Sreeja argues Sanjeev to marry her, suddenly Santhosh decides to marry Sreeja for Sanjeev and Abi's life to be happy. Then finally due to miserable circumstances Sanjeev married Abi without interest and Santhosh married Sreeja. After the marriage ends, Kandhasamy, Deivanai and Abi worries about Anu's death. Sanjeev is angry with Abi and unwillingly he invites her into his house. He plans to divorce her and they both keep this fact a secret from the family. Anu came as a spirit and helps Abi to reunite with Sanjeev. However, Sreeja and Chintamani become aware of existence and decide to take help of a pandit to somehow destroy her.

Cast

Main
 Shivani Narayanan / Chandini Tamilarasan in a dual role as:
 Anuradha "Anu" - Eldest twin born to Kandhasamy and Deivanai, Santhosh's ex-fiancee and a lawyer. She hates her younger twin sister Abi because she looks alike her. She was dead, killed by Sreeja.
 Abirami "Abi" - Youngest twin born to Kandhasamy and Deivanai, Sanjeev's wife and a tailor. She loves her sister Anu.
 Akshay Kamal as Sanjeev and Pandi (dual role)
 Sanjeev: Abi's husband; Santhosh's younger brother; Ramachandran and Seetha's second son (2019–2023) 
 Pandi: Sanjeev's look alike; a ruthless gangster in Tirunelveli district (2021–2022)

Recurring
 Nimesh Sagar as Santhosh: Anu's ex-fiancé; Sreeja's husband; Ramachandran and Seetha's first son (2019–2023)
 VJ Mounika as Sreeja: Santhosh's wife; Sanjeev's ex-fiancée; Chinthamani's daughter (2019–2023)
 Meena Vemuri as Chinthamani: Ramachandran's younger sister; Sreeja's mother and Santhosh's mother-in-law (2019–2023)
 Bharatha Naidu as Inspector Jhansi
 Tamil Selvi (2019–2020) / Meera Krishna (2020–2021) / Seetha Anil (2021–2023) in a dual role as  
 Seetha: Santhosh and Sanjeev's mother, Ramachandran's wife 
 Lakshmi: Seetha's twin sister and a great lawyer 
 L. Raja as Ramachandran: Santhosh and Sanjeev's father; Sreeja and Abi's father-in-law (2019–2021)
 Poovilangu Mohan as Kandhasamy: Anu and Abi's father; Sanjeev's father-in-law (2019–2020)
 Sabitha Anand as Deivanai: Anu and Abi's mother; Sanjeev's mother-in-law (2019–2020)
 Diwakar as Kaali: Seetha's younger brother (2019–present)
 Rashmika Roja as Muthazhagu: Sanjeev's wife (2021–2022)
 Jeyanthi Narayanan as Pandi's mother (2021–2022) 
 Senthilnathan as Pandi's father (2021–2022) 
 Sangavi (2021) / Dhanalakshmi (2021–2022) as Raasathi: Pandi's sister

Special appearances
 "Singer" Srikanth Deva as Himself: Anu, Santhosh, Sreeja and Sanjeev's marriage guest (2020)
 Madhan Bob as Kunchithapatham: A fake lawyer who cheats Sreeja and Chintamani (2020)
 Priya as Kavitha: Sreeja's aunt (2019-2020) 
 Indran as Salman: Abi's ex-fiancée (2019-2020) 
 Sujatha as Nagalakshmi: Salman's mother (2019-2020) 
 Bavithran as Sathish: Sreeja's first husband (2020)
 Vadivukkarasi as Tayamma (2022)

Development
The series first promo was released on 2 April 2019 on YouTube by Zee Tamil. It stars Shivani Narayanan as in the role of both Anu and Abi. Later due to outbreak of COVID-19 and to pursue the opportunity of entering Bigg Boss, Shivani quit the series. So, in August 2020, she was replaced by actress Chandini Tamilarasan. Tamil TV actor Siddharth Kumaran was initially approached for the lead male protagonist but later the production team finalised Kannada TV actor Karan Sagar (Nimesh Sagar) for the role as Anu's pair. TikTok fame Akshay Kamal was selected for another male protagonist as Abi's pair.

Special and crossover episodes
Rettai Roja cast and crew amalgamated the episodes called Triveni Sangamam with Endrendrum Punnagai and Rajamagal from 26 December 2020 to 9 January 2021. For the first time in the Indian television shows, three series to been combined.

From 29 August 2021 to 11 September 2021, This series held a one-hour special episode in non-prime time band.

References

External links
 
 Rettai Roja at ZEE5

Zee Tamil original programming
Tamil-language melodrama television series
Tamil-language television series based on Telugu-language television series
2019 Tamil-language television series debuts
Tamil-language television soap operas
Television shows set in Tamil Nadu
2023 Tamil-language television series endings